The 2018 Mae Young Classic was a multi-night special event and tournament promoted by the American professional wrestling promotion, WWE. It was the second Mae Young Classic tournament produced and was constituted by a 32-competitor tournament exclusively for women from WWE's NXT brand division and wrestlers from the independent circuit. The tournament took place at Full Sail University in Winter Park, Florida and was taped on August 8–9, 2018 and aired on the WWE Network from September 5 to October 4 (round 1, round 2, quarterfinals, and semifinals). The tournament final match aired live as part of WWE's all-female pay-per-view Evolution, which was held on October 28 at the Nassau Veterans Memorial Coliseum in Uniondale, New York. The winner of this second tournament was Toni Storm.

Background
In 2017, the American professional wrestling promotion WWE held a 32-woman tournament called the Mae Young Classic. It involved wrestlers from WWE's NXT brand and wrestlers from the independent circuit. The event was named in honor of the late WWE Hall of Famer Mae Young, who is considered a pioneer of women's wrestling. In April 2018, WWE announced a second Mae Young Classic tournament, following up on the 2017 tournament.

On June 22, 2018, WWE confirmed the tournament would once again have 32 competitors from NXT and the independent circuit, with the event being held at Full Sail University in Winter Park, Florida on August 8–9. On July 12, the first two competitors for the 2018 tournament were announced as Kaitlyn and Rhea Ripley. The tournament final match was scheduled to be held as part of WWE's all-female pay-per-view Evolution, taking place on October 28 at the Nassau Veterans Memorial Coliseum in Uniondale, New York.

On August 8, it was announced that the show would air every Wednesday on the WWE Network immediately after NXT, beginning September 5. Beth Phoenix, Renee Young, and Michael Cole were confirmed as the commentators for the event. In addition, the week prior to the first episode, WWE Network aired a bracketology special.

Qualifying match 
 NXT tapings'' – July 18 (Full Sail University – Winter Park, Florida)

Participants

Broadcast team

Tournament bracket 
The following time limits were in place:
 Round One: 15 minutes
 Round Two: 20 minutes
 Round Three: 25 minutes

<onlyinclude>

Aftermath
Performers on the tournament such as Deonna Purrazzo, Io Shirai, Jessie Elaban, Kacy Catanzaro, Kavita Devi, Lacey Lane, MJ Jenkins, Reina González, Rhea Ripley, Taynara Conti, Tegan Nox, and Xia Li already had signed contracts with the company. While Xia Brookside, Isla Dawn, Jinny, Killer Kelly, and winner Toni Storm had signed contracts with the company, performing on the NXT UK brand.

On August 25, 2018, Rhea Ripley started competing on the NXT UK brand, where she would eventually become the inaugural NXT UK Women's Champion.

On October 18, 2018, WWE announced that Mia Yim had been signed to a contract, performing on the NXT and NXT UK brand.

In February 2019, WWE announced that Rachael Ellering and Karen Q signed to contract and training at the WWE Performance Center.

In November 2019, All Elite Wrestling (AEW) announced that Big Swole (Aerial Monroe during the Mae Young Classic) signed with the company.

In January 2020, WWE
announced that Mercedes Martinez signed to contract WWE Performance Center.

On April 15, 2020, Deonna Purrazzo was released from her contract. Two days later, Taynara Conti and M.J Jenkins were also released from their contract as part of budget cuts due to the COVID-19 pandemic.

On January 20, 2021, NXT announced they had signed Priscilla Kelly, where she would be competing under the new ring name Gigi Dolin.

References

External links 
 

2018
Professional wrestling in Uniondale, New York
2018 on Long Island
Events on Long Island
August 2018 events in the United States
October 2018 events in the United States
Events in Uniondale, New York